Magda László (14 June 1912 – 2 August 2002) was a Hungarian operatic soprano particularly associated with 20th-century operas. She studied at the Franz Liszt Academy of Music in Budapest, and made her debut at the Budapest Opera in 1943, as Elisabeth in Tannhäuser, later singing Amelia in Simon Boccanegra.

In 1946, she settled in Italy, where she appeared in concert often with pianist Luigi Cortese, later becoming a regular guest at the Rome Opera and La Scala in Milan. She created the role of the mother in Dallapiccola's Il prigioniero on Italian radio in 1949, and also sang the part in the first staged performance in Florence, the following year, on May 20, 1950. A fine-singing actress and musician, she sang several parts in Italian contemporary works by Malipiero, Ghedini, and Lualdi.

She made guest appearances at the Glyndebourne Festival, notably in 1953, as Gluck's Alceste, in 1954, as Dorabella in Così fan tutte, in 1962, as Poppea in Monteverdi's L'incoronazione di Poppea. In 1954, she created the role of Cressida in William Walton's Troilus and Cressida, at the Royal Opera House in London.

Other notable roles included Strauss's Daphne, Busoni's Turandot, Marie in Wozzeck, Isolde in Tristan und Isolde, and Senta in Der fliegende Holländer.

László also recorded a number of the Bach cantatas under Hermann Scherchen.
She was the soprano soloist on Hermann Scherchen recording of Beethoven's 9th. (Westminster HI-FI, WAL 208, 1953)

Sources
 Operissimo
Bach-Cantatas.com

1919 births
2002 deaths
Franz Liszt Academy of Music alumni
Hungarian operatic sopranos
20th-century Hungarian women opera singers